Passio or Passio Domini Nostri is the Latin for a passion oratorio.

Passio may also refer to:
 Passio (Pärt), a passion cantata by Arvo Pärt
 Passio, Luis de Pablo (1930–2021)
 Passio Christi, Johann Balthasar Christian Freisslich (1687–1764)
 Passio Jesu Christi, Johann Friedrich Fasch (1688–1758)
 Passio Caeciliae, by Marco Frisina (born 1954)
 Passio, Krzysztof Penderecki
 Passio, Sergio Rendine
 Passio, Carlo Sturla

See also 
 Passion (disambiguation)